Aegomorphus satellinus is a species of beetle in the family Cerambycidae. It was described by Wilhelm Ferdinand Erichson in 1847.

References

Aegomorphus
Beetles described in 1847